Merenptah was an ancient Egyptian prince during the 19th Dynasty, likely to have been a son of Pharaoh Merenptah.

He is known from two statues of Senusret I usurped by Pharaoh Merenptah − found in Tanis and Alexandria, respectively − and from three statue fragments from Bubastis. Since he shares a name with Pharaoh Merenptah, also, his name is similar to that of the crown prince and eventual successor, Seti Merenptah, and he wears an uraeus usually worn by pharaohs only, it is a possibility that he is in fact the same as either of these two, but Prince Merenptah's titles slightly differ from those of the pharaoh and the crown prince, also, the Senusret statues were usurped by Merenptah when he was already a pharaoh. Also, Seti Merenptah used both his names as a prince and as a pharaoh. It is possible that Merenptah's use of a uraeus stems from the power struggle between Pharaoh Merenptah's heirs following his death.

Sources

Ancient Egyptian princes
Nineteenth Dynasty of Egypt